Glasscock County Independent School District is a public school district located in Garden City, Texas, U.S. The district educates about 300 students in two schools.

Glasscock County ISD is the home of the Bearkats and Ladykats. Their school colors are red, black, and white.  The football team won the 2009 Division I six-man football championship; the title game (against Strawn, a state six-man powerhouse in its own right) set several state championship records for a six-man contest:

Most points scored in a title game by the winning team (122 by Garden City), the losing team (88 by Strawn) and total (210)
Most points scored in a quarter (84 in the second quarter) and a half (116 in the first half)

In 2007, Glasscock County High School earned a Bronze Medal rank in the U.S. News/SchoolMatters Best High School ratings.

In 2009, the school district was rated "recognized" by the Texas Education Agency.

Schools

Special programs

Athletics
Garden City High School plays six-man football.

References 

Glasscock County Isd. National Center for Education Statistics. Retrieved on 2017-11-25.
Search for Public Schools. National Center for Education Statistics. Retrieved on 2017-11-25.
Administration. Glasscock County ISD. Retrieved on 2008-03-31.

External links
 

School districts in Glasscock County, Texas